This is a list of the bird species recorded in Djibouti. The avifauna of Djibouti include a total of 386 species, of which one is endemic, and 3 have been introduced by humans. 19 species are globally threatened.

This list's taxonomic treatment (designation and sequence of orders, families and species) and nomenclature (common and scientific names) follow the conventions of The Clements Checklist of Birds of the World, 2022 edition. The family accounts at the beginning of each heading reflect this taxonomy, as do the species counts found in each family account. Introduced and accidental species are included in the total counts for Djibouti.

The following tags have been used to highlight several categories, but not all species fall into one of these categories. Those that do not are commonly occurring native species.

 (A) Accidental - a species that rarely or accidentally occurs in Djibouti
 (E) Endemic - a species endemic to Djibouti
 (I) Introduced - a species introduced to Djibouti as a consequence, direct or indirect, of human actions

Ostriches
Order: StruthioniformesFamily: Struthionidae

The ostrich is a flightless bird native to Africa. It is the largest living species of bird. It is distinctive in its appearance, with a long neck and legs and the ability to run at high speeds.

Common ostrich, Struthio camelus
Somali ostrich, Struthio molybdophanes

Ducks, geese, and waterfowl
Order: AnseriformesFamily: Anatidae

Anatidae includes the ducks and most duck-like waterfowl, such as geese and swans. These birds are adapted to an aquatic existence with webbed feet, flattened bills, and feathers that are excellent at shedding water due to an oily coating.

Egyptian goose, Alopochen aegyptiacus
Garganey, Spatula querquedula
Blue-billed teal, Spatula hottentota (A)
Northern shoveler, Spatula clypeata
Eurasian wigeon, Mareca penelope (A)
Mallard, Anas platyrhynchos
Cape teal, Anas capensis (A)
Northern pintail, Anas acuta
Green-winged teal, Anas crecca (A)
Southern pochard, Netta erythrophthalma (A)
Tufted duck, Aythya fuligula

Pheasants, grouse, and allies
Order: GalliformesFamily: Phasianidae

The Phasianidae are a family of terrestrial birds which consists of quails, partridges, snowcocks, francolins, spurfowls, tragopans, monals, pheasants, peafowls and jungle fowls. In general, they are plump (although they vary in size) and have broad, relatively short wings. 

Common quail, Coturnix coturnix
Djibouti francolin, Pternistis ochropectus (E)
Yellow-necked francolin, Pternistis leucoscepus

Flamingos
Order: PhoenicopteriformesFamily: Phoenicopteridae

Flamingos filter-feed on shellfish and algae. Their oddly shaped beaks are specially adapted to separate mud and silt from the food they consume and, uniquely, are used upside-down. 

Greater flamingo, Phoenicopterus roseus
Lesser flamingo, Phoenicopterus minor

Grebes
Order: PodicipediformesFamily: Podicipedidae

Grebes are small to medium-large freshwater diving birds. They have lobed toes and are excellent swimmers and divers. However, they have their feet placed far back on the body, making them quite ungainly on land.

Little grebe, Tachybaptus ruficollis

Pigeons and doves
Order: ColumbiformesFamily: Columbidae

Pigeons and doves are stout-bodied birds with short necks and short slender bills with a fleshy cere.

Rock pigeon, Columba livia (I)
Speckled pigeon, Columba guinea
Rameron pigeon, Columba arquatrix
European turtle-dove, Streptopelia turtur
African collared-dove, Streptopelia roseogrisea
Laughing dove, Streptopelia senegalensis
Namaqua dove, Oena capensis
Bruce's green-pigeon, Treron waalia

Sandgrouse
Order: PterocliformesFamily: Pteroclidae

Sandgrouse have small, pigeon like heads and necks, but sturdy compact bodies. They have long pointed wings and sometimes tails and a fast direct flight. Flocks fly to watering holes at dawn and dusk. Their legs are feathered down to the toes.

Chestnut-bellied sandgrouse, Pterocles exustus
Spotted sandgrouse, Pterocles senegallus
Lichtenstein's sandgrouse, Pterocles lichtensteinii

Bustards
Order: OtidiformesFamily: Otididae

Bustards are large terrestrial birds mainly associated with dry open country and steppes in the Old World. They are omnivorous and nest on the ground. They walk steadily on strong legs and big toes, pecking for food as they go. They have long broad wings with "fingered" wingtips and striking patterns in flight. Many have interesting mating displays.

Arabian bustard, Ardeotis arabs
Heuglin's bustard, Neotis heuglinii

Cuckoos
Order: CuculiformesFamily: Cuculidae

The family Cuculidae includes cuckoos, roadrunners and anis. These birds are of variable size with slender bodies, long tails and strong legs. 

White-browed coucal, Centropus superciliosus
Great spotted cuckoo, Clamator glandarius (A)
Pied cuckoo, Clamator jacobinus (A)
Dideric cuckoo, Chrysococcyx caprius
African cuckoo, Cuculus gularis (A)
Common cuckoo, Cuculus canorus

Nightjars and allies
Order: CaprimulgiformesFamily: Caprimulgidae

Nightjars are medium-sized nocturnal birds that usually nest on the ground. They have long wings, short legs and very short bills. Most have small feet, of little use for walking, and long pointed wings. Their soft plumage is camouflaged to resemble bark or leaves.

Eurasian nightjar, Caprimulgus europaeus
Nubian nightjar, Caprimulgus nubicus
Plain nightjar, Caprimulgus inornatus (A)

Swifts
Order: CaprimulgiformesFamily: Apodidae

Swifts are small birds which spend the majority of their lives flying. These birds have very short legs and never settle voluntarily on the ground, perching instead only on vertical surfaces. Many swifts have long swept-back wings which resemble a crescent or boomerang. 

Alpine swift, Apus melba (A)
Common swift, Apus apus
Pallid swift, Apus pallidus (A)
Little swift, Apus affinis
African palm-swift, Cypsiurus parvus (A)

Rails, gallinules, and coots
Order: GruiformesFamily: Rallidae

Rallidae is a large family of small to medium-sized birds which includes the rails, crakes, coots and gallinules. Typically they inhabit dense vegetation in damp environments near lakes, swamps or rivers. In general they are shy and secretive birds, making them difficult to observe. Most species have strong legs and long toes which are well adapted to soft uneven surfaces. They tend to have short, rounded wings and to be weak fliers. 

Spotted crake, Porzana porzana (A)
Eurasian moorhen, Gallinula chloropus
Black crake, Zapornia flavirostris
Little crake, Zapornia parva (A)
Baillon's crake, Zapornia pusilla (A)

Cranes
Order: GruiformesFamily: Gruidae

Cranes are large, long-legged and long-necked birds. Unlike the similar-looking but unrelated herons, cranes fly with necks outstretched, not pulled back. Most have elaborate and noisy courting displays or "dances".

Common crane, Grus grus (A)

Thick-knees
Order: CharadriiformesFamily: Burhinidae

The thick-knees are a group of largely tropical waders in the family Burhinidae. They are found worldwide within the tropical zone, with some species also breeding in temperate Europe and Australia. They are medium to large waders with strong black or yellow-black bills, large yellow eyes and cryptic plumage. Despite being classed as waders, most species have a preference for arid or semi-arid habitats. 

Eurasian thick-knee, Burhinus oedicnemus
Indian thick-knee, Burhinus indicus
Senegal thick-knee, Burhinus senegalensis
Spotted thick-knee, Burhinus capensis

Stilts and avocets
Order: CharadriiformesFamily: Recurvirostridae

Recurvirostridae is a family of large wading birds, which includes the avocets and stilts. The avocets have long legs and long up-curved bills. The stilts have extremely long legs and long, thin, straight bills.

Black-winged stilt, Himantopus himantopus
Pied avocet, Recurvirostra avosetta

Oystercatchers
Order: CharadriiformesFamily: Haematopodidae

The oystercatchers are large and noisy plover-like birds, with strong bills used for smashing or prising open molluscs. 

Eurasian oystercatcher, Haematopus ostralegus

Plovers and lapwings
Order: CharadriiformesFamily: Charadriidae

The family Charadriidae includes the plovers, dotterels and lapwings. They are small to medium-sized birds with compact bodies, short, thick necks and long, usually pointed, wings. They are found in open country worldwide, mostly in habitats near water.

Black-bellied plover, Pluvialis squatarola
Pacific golden-plover, Pluvialis fulva
Spur-winged lapwing, Vanellus spinosus
Lesser sand-plover, Charadrius mongolus
Greater sand-plover, Charadrius leschenaultii
Caspian plover, Charadrius asiaticus (A)
Kittlitz's plover, Charadrius pecuarius
Kentish plover, Charadrius alexandrinus
Common ringed plover, Charadrius hiaticula
Little ringed plover, Charadrius dubius
Three-banded plover, Charadrius tricollaris

Sandpipers and allies
Order: CharadriiformesFamily: Scolopacidae

Scolopacidae is a large diverse family of small to medium-sized shorebirds including the sandpipers, curlews, godwits, shanks, tattlers, woodcocks, snipes, dowitchers and phalaropes. The majority of these species eat small invertebrates picked out of the mud or soil. Variation in length of legs and bills enables multiple species to feed in the same habitat, particularly on the coast, without direct competition for food.

Whimbrel, Numenius phaeopus
Eurasian curlew, Numenius arquata
Bar-tailed godwit, Limosa lapponica
Black-tailed godwit, Limosa limosa (A)
Ruddy turnstone, Arenaria interpres
Great knot, Calidris tenuirostris (A)
Red knot, Calidris canutus (A)
Ruff, Calidris pugnax
Broad-billed sandpiper, Calidris falcinellus
Curlew sandpiper, Calidris ferruginea
Temminck's stint, Calidris temminckii
Long-toed stint, Calidris subminuta (A)
Sanderling, Calidris alba
Dunlin, Calidris alpina
Little stint, Calidris minuta
Common snipe, Gallinago gallinago
Terek sandpiper, Xenus cinereus
Red-necked phalarope, Phalaropus lobatus (A)
Common sandpiper, Actitis hypoleucos
Green sandpiper, Tringa ochropus
Spotted redshank, Tringa erythropus (A)
Common greenshank, Tringa nebularia
Marsh sandpiper, Tringa stagnatilis
Wood sandpiper, Tringa glareola
Common redshank, Tringa totanus

Crab plover
Order: CharadriiformesFamily: Dromadidae

The crab plover is related to the waders. It resembles a plover but with very long grey legs and a strong heavy black bill similar to a tern. It has black-and-white plumage, a long neck, partially webbed feet and a bill designed for eating crabs.

Crab-plover, Dromas ardeola

Pratincoles and coursers
Order: CharadriiformesFamily: Glareolidae

Glareolidae is a family of wading birds comprising the pratincoles, which have short legs, long pointed wings and long forked tails, and the coursers, which have long legs, short wings and long, pointed bills which curve downwards.

Cream-colored courser, Cursorius cursor
Somali courser, Cursorius somalensis
Double-banded courser, Smutsornis africanus (A)
Collared pratincole, Glareola pratincola (A)

Skuas and jaegers
Order: CharadriiformesFamily: Stercorariidae

The family Stercorariidae are, in general, medium to large birds, typically with grey or brown plumage, often with white markings on the wings. They nest on the ground in temperate and arctic regions and are long-distance migrants.

Pomarine jaeger, Stercorarius pomarinus

Gulls, terns, and skimmers
Order: CharadriiformesFamily: Laridae

Laridae is a family of medium to large seabirds, the gulls, terns and skimmers. Gulls are typically grey or white, often with black markings on the head or wings. They have stout, longish bills and webbed feet. Terns are a group of generally medium to large seabirds typically with grey or white plumage, often with black markings on the head. Most terns hunt fish by diving but some pick insects off the surface of fresh water. Terns are generally long-lived birds, with several species known to live in excess of 30 years.

Slender-billed gull, Chroicocephalus genei (A)
Black-headed gull, Chroicocephalus ridibundus
White-eyed gull, Ichthyaetus leucophthalmus
Sooty gull, Ichthyaetus hemprichii
Herring gull, Larus argentatus
Caspian gull, Larus cachinnans (A)
Armenian gull, Larus armenicus
Lesser black-backed gull, Larus fuscus
Brown noddy, Anous stolidus
Sooty tern, Onychoprion fuscatus
Bridled tern, Onychoprion anaethetus
Little tern, Sternula albifrons
Saunders's tern, Sternula saundersi
Gull-billed tern, Gelochelidon nilotica
Caspian tern, Hydroprogne caspia
Black tern, Chlidonias niger
White-winged tern, Chlidonias leucopterus
Whiskered tern, Chlidonias hybrida (A)
Common tern, Sterna hirundo
White-cheeked tern, Sterna repressa
Great crested tern, Thalasseus bergii
Sandwich tern, Thalasseus sandvicensis
Lesser crested tern, Thalasseus bengalensis

Tropicbirds
Order: PhaethontiformesFamily: Phaethontidae

Tropicbirds are slender white birds of tropical oceans, with exceptionally long central tail feathers. Their heads and long wings have black markings.

Red-billed tropicbird, Phaethon aethereus

Southern storm-petrels
Order: ProcellariiformesFamily: Oceanitidae

The southern storm-petrels are relatives of the petrels and are the smallest seabirds. They feed on planktonic crustaceans and small fish picked from the surface, typically while hovering. The flight is fluttering and sometimes bat-like.

Wilson's storm-petrel, Oceanites oceanicus

Northern storm-petrels
Order: ProcellariiformesFamily: Hydrobatidae

The northern storm-petrels are relatives of the petrels and are the smallest seabirds. They feed on planktonic crustaceans and small fish picked from the surface, typically while hovering. The flight is fluttering and sometimes bat-like.

Swinhoe's storm-petrel, Hydrobates monorhis (A)

Shearwaters and petrels
Order: ProcellariiformesFamily: Procellariidae

The procellariids are the main group of medium-sized "true petrels", characterised by united nostrils with medium septum and a long outer functional primary.

Southern giant-petrel, Macronectes giganteus (A)
Atlantic petrel, Pterodroma incerta (A)
Jouanin's petrel, Bulweria fallax (A)
Flesh-footed shearwater, Ardenna carneipes (A)
Tropical shearwater, Ardenna bailloni
Persian shearwater, Puffinus persicus (A)

Storks
Order: CiconiiformesFamily: Ciconiidae

Storks are large, long-legged, long-necked, wading birds with long, stout bills. Storks are mute, but bill-clattering is an important mode of communication at the nest. Their nests can be large and may be reused for many years. Many species are migratory.

Black stork, Ciconia nigra
Abdim's stork, Ciconia abdimii
White stork, Ciconia ciconia
Marabou stork, Leptoptilos crumenifer (A)
Yellow-billed stork, Mycteria ibis

Frigatebirds
Order: SuliformesFamily: Fregatidae

Frigatebirds are large seabirds usually found over tropical oceans. They are large, black-and-white or completely black, with long wings and deeply forked tails. The males have coloured inflatable throat pouches. They do not swim or walk and cannot take off from a flat surface. Having the largest wingspan-to-body-weight ratio of any bird, they are essentially aerial, able to stay aloft for more than a week.

Lesser frigatebird, Fregata ariel (A)

Boobies and gannets
Order: SuliformesFamily: Sulidae

The sulids comprise the gannets and boobies. Both groups are medium to large coastal seabirds that plunge-dive for fish. 

Masked booby, Sula dactylatra (A)
Brown booby, Sula leucogaster
Red-footed booby, Sula sula (A)

Cormorants and shags
Order: SuliformesFamily: Phalacrocoracidae

Phalacrocoracidae is a family of medium to large coastal, fish-eating seabirds that includes cormorants and shags. Plumage colouration varies, with the majority having mainly dark plumage, some species being black-and-white and a few being colourful.

Long-tailed cormorant, Microcarbo africanus (A)
Socotra cormorant, Phalacrocorax nigrogularis (A)

Pelicans
Order: PelecaniformesFamily: Pelecanidae

Pelicans are large water birds with a distinctive pouch under their beak. As with other members of the order Pelecaniformes, they have webbed feet with four toes.

Great white pelican, Pelecanus onocrotalus
Pink-backed pelican, Pelecanus rufescens

Hammerkop
Order: PelecaniformesFamily: Scopidae

The hammerkop is a medium-sized bird with a long shaggy crest. The shape of its head with a curved bill and crest at the back is reminiscent of a hammer, hence its name. Its plumage is drab-brown all over.

Hamerkop, Scopus umbretta

Herons, egrets, and bitterns
Order: PelecaniformesFamily: Ardeidae

The family Ardeidae contains the bitterns, herons and egrets. Herons and egrets are medium to large wading birds with long necks and legs. Bitterns tend to be shorter necked and more wary. Members of Ardeidae fly with their necks retracted, unlike other long-necked birds such as storks, ibises and spoonbills.

Yellow bittern, Ixobrychus sinensis (A)
Little bittern, Ixobrychus minutus
Gray heron, Ardea cinerea
Black-headed heron, Ardea melanocephala
Goliath heron, Ardea goliath
Purple heron, Ardea purpurea
Great egret, Ardea alba
Intermediate egret, Ardea intermedia (A)
Little egret, Egretta garzetta
Western reef-heron, Egretta gularis
Black heron, Egretta ardesiaca
Cattle egret, Bubulcus ibis
Squacco heron, Ardeola ralloides
Striated heron, Butorides striata
Black-crowned night-heron, Nycticorax nycticorax (A)

Ibises and spoonbills
Order: PelecaniformesFamily: Threskiornithidae

Threskiornithidae is a family of large terrestrial and wading birds which includes the ibises and spoonbills. They have long, broad wings with 11 primary and about 20 secondary feathers. They are strong fliers and despite their size and weight, very capable soarers.

Glossy ibis, Plegadis falcinellus
African sacred ibis, Threskiornis aethiopicus
Eurasian spoonbill, Platalea leucorodia
African spoonbill, Platalea alba

Secretarybird
Order: AccipitriformesFamily: Sagittariidae

The secretarybird is a bird of prey in the order Accipitriformes but is easily distinguished from other raptors by its long crane-like legs.

Secretarybird, Sagittarius serpentarius (A)

Osprey
Order: AccipitriformesFamily: Pandionidae

The family Pandionidae contains only one species, the osprey. The osprey is a medium-large raptor which is a specialist fish-eater with a worldwide distribution.

Osprey, Pandion haliaetus

Hawks, eagles, and kites 
Order: AccipitriformesFamily: Accipitridae

Accipitridae is a family of birds of prey, which includes hawks, eagles, kites, harriers and Old World vultures. These birds have powerful hooked beaks for tearing flesh from their prey, strong legs, powerful talons and keen eyesight.

Black-winged kite, Elanus caeruleus (A)
Scissor-tailed kite, Chelictinia riocourii
Bearded vulture, Gypaetus barbatus (A)
Egyptian vulture, Neophron percnopterus
European honey-buzzard, Pernis apivorus
Oriental honey-buzzard, Pernis ptilorhynchus (A)
White-headed vulture, Trigonoceps occipitalis
Lappet-faced vulture, Torgos tracheliotos
Hooded vulture, Necrosyrtes monachus
White-backed vulture, Gyps africanus
Rüppell's griffon, Gyps rueppelli
Eurasian griffon, Gyps fulvus (A)
Bateleur, Terathopius ecaudatus
Short-toed snake-eagle, Circaetus gallicus
Long-crested eagle, Lophaetus occipitalis (A)
Lesser spotted eagle, Clanga pomarina
Greater spotted eagle, Clanga clanga
Booted eagle, Hieraaetus pennatus
Tawny eagle, Aquila rapax (A)
Steppe eagle, Aquila nipalensis
Imperial eagle, Aquila heliaca
Verreaux's eagle, Aquila verreauxii
Bonelli's eagle, Aquila fasciata
African hawk-eagle, Aquila spilogaster (A)
Dark chanting-goshawk, Melierax metabates
Eastern chanting-goshawk, Melierax poliopterus
Grasshopper buzzard, Butastur rufipennis (A)
Eurasian marsh-harrier, Circus aeruginosus
Hen harrier, Circus cyaneus
Pallid harrier, Circus macrourus
Montagu's harrier, Circus pygargus
Shikra, Accipiter badius
Levant sparrowhawk, Accipiter brevipes
Eurasian sparrowhawk, Accipiter nisus
Black kite, Milvus migrans
Common buzzard, Buteo buteo
Long-legged buzzard, Buteo rufinus
Augur buzzard, Buteo augur

Owls
Order: StrigiformesFamily: Strigidae

The typical owls are small to large solitary nocturnal birds of prey. They have large forward-facing eyes and ears, a hawk-like beak and a conspicuous circle of feathers around each eye called a facial disk. 

African scops-owl, Otus senegalensis
Northern white-faced owl, Ptilopsis leucotis
Grayish eagle-owl, Bubo cinerascens
Verreaux's eagle-owl, Bubo lacteus
Little owl, Athene noctua
Short-eared owl, Asio flammeus (A)

Mousebirds
Order: ColiiformesFamily: Coliidae

The mousebirds are slender greyish or brown birds with soft, hairlike body feathers and very long thin tails. They are arboreal and scurry through the leaves like rodents in search of berries, fruit and buds. They are acrobatic and can feed upside down. All species have strong claws and reversible outer toes. They also have crests and stubby bills. 

Speckled mousebird, Colius striatus
Blue-naped mousebird, Urocolius macrourus

Hoopoes
Order: BucerotiformesFamily: Upupidae

Hoopoes have black, white and orangey-pink colouring with a large erectile crest on their head.

Eurasian hoopoe, Upupa epops

Hornbills
Order: BucerotiformesFamily: Bucerotidae

Hornbills are a group of birds whose bill is shaped like a cow's horn, but without a twist, sometimes with a casque on the upper mandible. Frequently, the bill is brightly coloured.

Hemprich's hornbill, Lophoceros hemprichii
Eastern yellow-billed hornbill, Tockus flavirostris

Kingfishers
Order: CoraciiformesFamily: Alcedinidae

Kingfishers are medium-sized birds with large heads, long, pointed bills, short legs and stubby tails.

Malachite kingfisher, Corythornis cristatus
Gray-headed kingfisher, Halcyon leucocephala

Bee-eaters
Order: CoraciiformesFamily: Meropidae

The bee-eaters are a group of near passerine birds in the family Meropidae. Most species are found in Africa but others occur in southern Europe, Madagascar, Australia and New Guinea. They are characterised by richly coloured plumage, slender bodies and usually elongated central tail feathers. All are colourful and have long downturned bills and pointed wings, which give them a swallow-like appearance when seen from afar.

White-throated bee-eater, Merops albicollis
Blue-cheeked bee-eater, Merops persicus
Madagascar bee-eater, Merops superciliosus (A)
European bee-eater, Merops apiaster

Rollers
Order: CoraciiformesFamily: Coraciidae

Rollers resemble crows in size and build, but are more closely related to the kingfishers and bee-eaters. They share the colourful appearance of those groups with blues and browns predominating. The two inner front toes are connected, but the outer toe is not.

European roller, Coracias garrulus
Abyssinian roller, Coracias abyssinica (A)
Rufous-crowned roller, Coracias naevius (A)

African barbets
Order: PiciformesFamily: Lybiidae

The barbets are plump birds, with short necks and large heads. They get their name from the bristles which fringe their heavy bills. Most species are brightly coloured.

Yellow-breasted barbet, Trachyphonus margaritatus
Black-throated barbet, Tricholaema melanocephala

Woodpeckers
Order: PiciformesFamily: Picidae

Woodpeckers are small to medium-sized birds with chisel-like beaks, short legs, stiff tails and long tongues used for capturing insects. Some species have feet with two toes pointing forward and two backward, while several species have only three toes. Many woodpeckers have the habit of tapping noisily on tree trunks with their beaks.

Eurasian wryneck, Jynx torquilla
Cardinal woodpecker, Chloropicus fuscescens
Nubian woodpecker, Campethera nubica

Caracaras and falcons
Order: FalconiformesFamily: Falconidae

Falconidae is a family of diurnal birds of prey. They differ from hawks, eagles and kites in that they kill with their beaks instead of their talons. 

Lesser kestrel, Falco naumanni
Eurasian kestrel, Falco tinnunculus
Fox kestrel, Falco alopex (A)
Red-footed falcon, Falco vespertinus (A)
Eleonora's falcon, Falco eleonorae (A)
Sooty falcon, Falco concolor
Eurasian hobby, Falco subbuteo
Lanner falcon, Falco biarmicus
Saker falcon, Falco cherrug (A)
Peregrine falcon, Falco peregrinus

Old World parrots
Order: PsittaciformesFamily: Psittaculidae

Characteristic features of parrots include a strong curved bill, an upright stance, strong legs, and clawed zygodactyl feet. Many parrots are vividly colored, and some are multi-colored. Old World parrots are found from Africa east across south and southeast Asia and Oceania to Australia and New Zealand.

Rose-ringed parakeet, Psittacula krameri

Old World orioles
Order: PasseriformesFamily: Oriolidae

The Old World orioles are colourful passerine birds. They are not related to the New World orioles. 

Eurasian golden oriole, Oriolus oriolus

Wattle-eyes and batises
Order: PasseriformesFamily: Platysteiridae

The wattle-eyes, or puffback flycatchers, are small stout passerine birds of the African tropics. They get their name from the brightly coloured fleshy eye decorations found in most species in this group. 

Gray-headed batis, Batis orientalis

Bushshrikes and allies
Order: PasseriformesFamily: Malaconotidae

Bushshrikes are similar in habits to shrikes, hunting insects and other small prey from a perch on a bush. Although similar in build to the shrikes, these tend to be either colourful species or largely black; some species are quite secretive.

Black-crowned tchagra, Tchagra senegala
Ethiopian boubou, Laniarius aethiopicus
Rosy-patched bushshrike, Rhodophoneus cruentus

Drongos
Order: PasseriformesFamily: Dicruridae

The drongos are mostly black or dark grey in colour, sometimes with metallic tints. They have long forked tails, and some Asian species have elaborate tail decorations. They have short legs and sit very upright when perched, like a shrike. They flycatch or take prey from the ground.

Glossy-backed drongo, Dicrurus divaricatus

Monarch flycatchers
Order: PasseriformesFamily: Monarchidae

The monarch flycatchers are small to medium-sized insectivorous passerines which hunt by flycatching.

African paradise-flycatcher, Terpsiphone viridis

Shrikes
Order: PasseriformesFamily: Laniidae

Shrikes are passerine birds known for their habit of catching other birds and small animals and impaling the uneaten portions of their bodies on thorns. A typical shrike's beak is hooked, like a bird of prey.

Red-backed shrike, Lanius collurio
Red-tailed shrike, Lanius phoenicuroides
Isabelline shrike, Lanius isabellinus
Great gray shrike, Lanius excubitor (A)
Lesser gray shrike, Lanius minor
Somali fiscal, Lanius somalicus (A)
Masked shrike, Lanius nubicus

Crows, jays, and magpies
Order: PasseriformesFamily: Corvidae

The family Corvidae includes crows, ravens, jays, choughs, magpies, treepies, nutcrackers and ground jays. Corvids are above average in size among the Passeriformes, and some of the larger species show high levels of intelligence.

House crow, Corvus splendens (I)
Pied crow, Corvus albus
Somali crow, Corvus edithae
Fan-tailed raven, Corvus rhipidurus

Larks
Order: PasseriformesFamily: Alaudidae

Larks are small terrestrial birds with often extravagant songs and display flights. Most larks are fairly dull in appearance. Their food is insects and seeds. 

Greater hoopoe-lark, Alaemon alaudipes
Desert lark, Ammomanes deserti
Black-crowned sparrow-lark, Eremopterix nigriceps
Greater short-toed lark, Calandrella brachydactyla (A)
Bimaculated lark, Melanocorypha bimaculata (A)
Crested lark, Galerida cristata

African warblers
Order: PasseriformesFamily: Macrosphenidae

African warblers are small to medium-sized insectivores which are found in a wide variety of habitats south of the Sahara.

Northern crombec, Sylvietta brachyura

Cisticolas and allies
Order: PasseriformesFamily: Cisticolidae

The Cisticolidae are warblers found mainly in warmer southern regions of the Old World. They are generally very small birds of drab brown or grey appearance found in open country such as grassland or scrub.

Green-backed camaroptera, Camaroptera brachyura
Cricket longtail, Spiloptila clamans
Graceful prinia, Prinia gracilis
Pale prinia, Prinia somalica (A)
Red-fronted prinia, Prinia rufifrons

Reed warblers and allies
Order: PasseriformesFamily: Acrocephalidae

The members of this family are usually rather large for "warblers". Most are rather plain olivaceous brown above with much yellow to beige below. They are usually found in open woodland, reedbeds, or tall grass. The family occurs mostly in southern to western Eurasia and surroundings, but it also ranges far into the Pacific, with some species in Africa.

Eastern olivaceous warbler, Iduna pallida
Upcher's warbler, Hippolais languida
Olive-tree warbler, Hippolais olivetorum (A)
Sedge warbler, Acrocephalus schoenobaenus (A)
Marsh warbler, Acrocephalus palustris (A)
Common reed warbler, Acrocephalus scirpaceus (A)
Great reed warbler, Acrocephalus arundinaceus (A)
Clamorous reed warbler, Acrocephalus stentoreus (A)

Grassbirds and allies
Order: PasseriformesFamily: Locustellidae

Locustellidae are a family of small insectivorous songbirds found mainly in Eurasia, Africa, and the Australian region. They are smallish birds with tails that are usually long and pointed, and tend to be drab brownish or buffy all over.

River warbler, Locustella fluviatilis (A)
Savi's warbler, Locustella luscinioides (A)
Little rush warbler, Bradypterus baboecala

Swallows
Order: PasseriformesFamily: Hirundinidae

The family Hirundinidae is adapted to aerial feeding. They have a slender streamlined body, long pointed wings and a short bill with a wide gape. The feet are adapted to perching rather than walking, and the front toes are partially joined at the base.

Bank swallow, Riparia riparia
Rock martin, Ptyonoprogne fuligula
Barn swallow, Hirundo rustica
Red-rumped swallow, Cecropis daurica (A)
Common house-martin, Delichon urbicum (A)

Bulbuls
Order: PasseriformesFamily: Pycnonotidae

Bulbuls are medium-sized songbirds. Some are colourful with yellow, red or orange vents, cheeks, throats or supercilia, but most are drab, with uniform olive-brown to black plumage. Some species have distinct crests. 

Common bulbul, Pycnonotus barbatus

Leaf warblers
Order: PasseriformesFamily: Phylloscopidae

Leaf warblers are a family of small insectivorous birds found mostly in Eurasia and ranging into Wallacea and Africa. The species are of various sizes, often green-plumaged above and yellow below, or more subdued with greyish-green to greyish-brown colours.

Wood warbler, Phylloscopus sibilatrix
Willow warbler, Phylloscopus trochilus
Common chiffchaff, Phylloscopus collybita
Brown woodland-warbler, Phylloscopus umbrovirens

Sylviid warblers, parrotbills, and allies 
Order: PasseriformesFamily: Sylviidae

The family Sylviidae is a group of small insectivorous passerine birds. They mainly occur as breeding species, as the common name implies, in Europe, Asia and, to a lesser extent, Africa. Most are of generally undistinguished appearance, but many have distinctive songs.

Eurasian blackcap, Sylvia atricapilla
Garden warbler, Sylvia borin (A)
Barred warbler, Curruca nisoria
Lesser whitethroat, Curruca curruca
Arabian warbler, Curruca leucomelaena
Western Orphean warbler, Curruca hortensis
Eastern Orphean warbler, Curruca crassirostris (A)
Asian desert warbler, Curruca nana
Menetries's warbler, Curruca mystacea
Rüppell's warbler, Curruca ruppeli (A)
Eastern subalpine warbler, Curruca cantillans
Greater whitethroat, Curruca communis

White-eyes, yuhinas, and allies
Order: PasseriformesFamily: Zosteropidae

The white-eyes are small and mostly undistinguished, their plumage above being generally some dull colour like greenish-olive, but some species have a white or bright yellow throat, breast or lower parts, and several have buff flanks. As their name suggests, many species have a white ring around each eye.

Abyssinian white-eye, Zosterops abyssinicus

Laughingthrushes and allies
Order: PasseriformesFamily: Leiothrichidae

The laughingthrushes are somewhat diverse in size and colouration, but are characterised by soft fluffy plumage.

Arabian babbler, Argya squamiceps (A)

Oxpeckers
Order: PasseriformesFamily: Buphagidae

As both the English and scientific names of these birds imply, they feed on ectoparasites, primarily ticks, found on large mammals.

Red-billed oxpecker, Buphagus erythrorynchus

Starlings
Order: PasseriformesFamily: Sturnidae

Starlings are small to medium-sized passerine birds. Their flight is strong and direct and they are very gregarious. Their preferred habitat is fairly open country. They eat insects and fruit. Plumage is typically dark with a metallic sheen.

European starling, Sturnus vulgaris (A)
Wattled starling, Creatophora cinerea
Violet-backed starling, Cinnyricinclus leucogaster
Somali starling, Onychognathus blythii
White-crowned starling, Lamprotornis albicapillus

Thrushes and allies
Order: PasseriformesFamily: Turdidae

The thrushes are a group of passerine birds that occur mainly in the Old World. They are plump, soft plumaged, small to medium-sized insectivores or sometimes omnivores, often feeding on the ground. Many have attractive songs.

Song thrush, Turdus philomelos

Old World flycatchers
Order: PasseriformesFamily: Muscicapidae

Old World flycatchers are a large group of small passerine birds native to the Old World. They are mainly small arboreal insectivores. The appearance of these birds is highly varied, but they mostly have weak songs and harsh calls.

Spotted flycatcher, Muscicapa striata
Gambaga flycatcher, Muscicapa gambagae
Black scrub-robin, Cercotrichas podobe
Rufous-tailed scrub-robin, Cercotrichas galactotes
White-throated robin, Irania gutturalis
Thrush nightingale, Luscinia luscinia (A)
Common nightingale, Luscinia megarhynchos (A)
Bluethroat, Luscinia svecica (A)
Semicollared flycatcher, Ficedula semitorquata (A)
Common redstart, Phoenicurus phoenicurus
Black redstart, Phoenicurus ochruros
Little rock-thrush, Monticola solitarius
Rufous-tailed rock-thrush, Monticola saxatilis
Blue rock-thrush, Monticola solitarius
Whinchat, Saxicola rubetra
European stonechat, Saxicola rubicola
Siberian stonechat, Saxicola maurus (A)
African stonechat, Saxicola torquatus
Northern wheatear, Oenanthe oenanthe
Red-breasted wheatear, Oenanthe bottae (A)
Isabelline wheatear, Oenanthe isabellina
Heuglin's wheatear, Oenanthe heuglini (A)
Hooded wheatear, Oenanthe monacha (A)
Desert wheatear, Oenanthe deserti
Western black-eared wheatear, Oenanthe hispanica
Cyprus wheatear, Oenanthe cypriaca (A)
Eastern black-eared wheatear, Oenanthe melanoleuca (A)
Pied wheatear, Oenanthe pleschanka
Blackstart, Oenanthe melanura
Brown-tailed chat, Oenanthe scotocerca (A)
White-crowned wheatear, Oenanthe leucopyga
Kurdish wheatear, Oenanthe xanthoprymna (A)

Sunbirds and spiderhunters
Order: PasseriformesFamily: Nectariniidae

The sunbirds and spiderhunters are very small passerine birds which feed largely on nectar, although they will also take insects, especially when feeding young. Flight is fast and direct on their short wings. Most species can take nectar by hovering like a hummingbird, but usually perch to feed. 

Eastern violet-backed sunbird, Anthreptes orientalis (A)
Nile Valley sunbird, Hedydipna metallica
Beautiful sunbird, Cinnyris pulchellus
Shining sunbird, Cinnyris habessinicus
Variable sunbird, Cinnyris venustus (A)

Weavers and allies
Order: PasseriformesFamily: Ploceidae

The weavers are small passerine birds related to the finches. They are seed-eating birds with rounded conical bills. The males of many species are brightly coloured, usually in red or yellow and black, some species show variation in colour only in the breeding season.

Lesser masked weaver, Ploceus intermedius
Rüppell's weaver, Ploceus galbula
Village weaver, Ploceus cucullatus (A)
Red-billed quelea, Quelea quelea (A)

Waxbills and allies
Order: PasseriformesFamily: Estrildidae

The estrildid finches are small passerine birds of the Old World tropics and Australasia. They are gregarious and often colonial seed eaters with short thick but pointed bills. They are all similar in structure and habits, but have wide variation in plumage colours and patterns.

African silverbill, Euodice cantans
Crimson-rumped waxbill, Estrilda rhodopyga
Quailfinch, Ortygospiza atricollis (A)
Cut-throat, Amadina fasciata (A)
Green-winged pytilia, Pytilia melba
Red-billed firefinch, Lagonosticta senegala

Indigobirds
Order: PasseriformesFamily: Viduidae

The indigobirds are finch-like species which usually have black or indigo predominating in their plumage. All are brood parasites, which lay their eggs in the nests of estrildid finches.

Pin-tailed whydah, Vidua macroura (A)
Village indigobird, Vidua chalybeata (A)

Old World sparrows
Order: PasseriformesFamily: Passeridae

Old World sparrows are small passerine birds. In general, sparrows tend to be small, plump, brown or grey birds with short tails and short powerful beaks. Sparrows are seed eaters, but they also consume small insects. 

House sparrow, Passer domesticus (I)
Somali sparrow, Passer castanopterus
Swainson's sparrow, Passer swainsonii
Arabian golden sparrow, Passer euchlorus
Pale rockfinch, Carpospiza brachydactyla

Wagtails and pipits
Order: PasseriformesFamily: Motacillidae

Motacillidae is a family of small passerine birds with medium to long tails. They include the wagtails, longclaws and pipits. They are slender, ground feeding insectivores of open country. 

Gray wagtail, Motacilla cinerea
Western yellow wagtail, Motacilla flava
Citrine wagtail, Motacilla citreola (A)
White wagtail, Motacilla alba
African pipit, Anthus cinnamomeus
Long-billed pipit, Anthus similis
Tawny pipit, Anthus campestris
Tree pipit, Anthus trivialis
Red-throated pipit, Anthus cervinus
Golden pipit, Tmetothylacus tenellus (A)

Finches, euphonias, and allies
Order: PasseriformesFamily: Fringillidae

Finches are seed-eating passerine birds, that are small to moderately large and have a strong beak, usually conical and in some species very large. All have twelve tail feathers and nine primaries. These birds have a bouncing flight with alternating bouts of flapping and gliding on closed wings, and most sing well.

Trumpeter finch, Bucanetes githagineus (A)
Reichenow's seedeater, Crithagra reichenowi

Old World buntings
Order: PasseriformesFamily: Emberizidae

The emberizids are a large family of passerine birds. They are seed-eating birds with distinctively shaped bills. Many emberizid species have distinctive head patterns.

Ortolan bunting, Emberiza hortulana
Cretzschmar's bunting, Emberiza caesia (A)
Cinnamon-breasted bunting, Emberiza tahapisi
Striolated bunting, Emberiza striolata

See also
List of birds
Lists of birds by region

References

Djibouti
Djibouti
Birds
Djibouti